Ozurgeti is a village in the Ozurgeti Municipality of Guria in western Georgia. It is located on the Natenebi River, 2 kilometres from the city Ozurgeti. On 11 April 1918, a small battle was fought there between the Ottoman Empire and the Transcaucasian Commissariat. A cemetery for the Ottoman soldiers is located in the village. From 1930 until 1989, the village was named Makharadze in honour of Filipp Makharadze, a Georgian Bolshevik.

References

Populated places in Ozurgeti Municipality